EdVenture is the largest children's museum in the Southeast United States, located in Columbia, South Carolina.  It is second only to The Children's Museum of Indianapolis which is the largest children's museum in the world.

EdVenture opened to the public in 2003. It has 8 galleries covering , plus hands-on exhibits, 2 resource centers, and a 200-seat theater.  of the total  is devoted to exhibit galleries, laboratories and visitor amenities. An additional  of outdoor gallery space is located just outside the museum's front door. Within the total  there are approximately 350 individual hands-on exhibits. There is also a three-story tall statue of 'Eddie' on the first floor of the museum which children can climb into and learn about human physiology.

EdVenture is located at 211 Gervais Street in midtown Columbia, next to the South Carolina State Museum.

References

External links
EdVenture

Museums in Columbia, South Carolina
Children's museums in South Carolina